Cosmonaut Glacier is a tributary glacier,  long, in the Southern Cross Mountains, flowing east along the south side of the Arrowhead Range to enter Aviator Glacier, in Victoria Land. It was named by the northern party of the New Zealand Geological Survey Antarctic Expedition, 1962–63, in association with Aviator, Aeronaut, and Astronaut Glaciers.

References 

Glaciers of Victoria Land
Borchgrevink Coast